Magrassi is a surname. Notable people with the surname include:

Andrea Magrassi (born 1993), Italian footballer
Blanca Magrassi Scagno (1923–2015), Mexican activist
 (1908–1974), Italian virologist
Paolo Magrassi, Italian technologist

Surnames of Italian origin